Pingley POW (prisoner of war) camp is one of the few prisoner of war camps in the United Kingdom that remains in good condition. Unlike the relatively nearby Eden Camp which is preserved as a Second World War museum, Pingley Camp lies in a semi derelict state in the grounds of Pingley Farm. It is situated on the outskirts of Brigg, Lincolnshire.

The camp was used to house mainly Italian prisoners of war, though Germans were also held there.
After the war the camp was used as an emergency sheltered housing under the name Pingley Farm Hostel. The original buildings used (and constructed) by the prisoners are situated towards the rear of the site entrance and remain in bad condition. The brick buildings at the front of the site are in fairly good condition, and have post war modifications dating from around 1950–1980.

The camp has been demolished as of January 2009, and the site is due for redevelopment as housing.

The area is being developed with ten luxury executive houses.  The first was started in July 2010.

References 
 English Heritage – Prisoner of War Camps (1939–1948), Twentieth Century Military Recording Project

Military history of Lincolnshire
World War II prisoner of war camps in England
Buildings and structures in Lincolnshire